Şix Salahlı (also, Shikh-Salagly, Shikhsalakhly, and Shykhsalakhly) is a village and municipality in the Sabirabad Rayon of Azerbaijan.  It has a population of 1,482.

References 

Populated places in Sabirabad District